Prosper is a town in Collin and Denton counties in the U.S. state of Texas. Prosper is located within the Dallas-Fort Worth-Arlington metropolitan area. As of the 2010 census, its population was 9,423; as of 2020, its population was 30,174.

History
The first settlers arrived in 1846 to farm cotton in the black fertile prairie soil. Between 1850 and 1902, two settlements existed - Rock Hill was two miles south of the present town and Richland was one mile north. The development of these small communities was expedited in 1876 when county courts ordered small tracts of land to be established for a quick sale. These tracts, each about 160 acres in size, were sold for $3.50 per acre. Dr. A. T. Bryant of McKinney purchased what later became the center of the present town.

The towns merged during the establishment of St. Louis & San Francisco Railroad in March 1902. For years, Prosper was the central stop for the railroad between Dallas and Sherman. When community officials applied for a post office with the name "Richland", they were informed that the city name was already taken. Postmaster B.J. Naugle asked for an alternative name, and J.C. Slaughter suggested the name "Prosper" because crops that year had been very prosperous.

Prosper was incorporated in 1914 with a commission form of government and a population of 500. Uncas Norvell Clary was mayor and served in that position for the next 49 years. Prosper became a growing area with many new homes and communities being developed. The Prosper Community of Windsong Ranch features a man-made crystalline lagoon.

Geography

Demographics

According to the 2020 U.S. census, the town of Prosper had a population of 30,174, up from 9,423 at the 2010 census.

Arts and culture

Prosper holds an annual Christmas festival, and Fourth of July event. Each May, Prosper Founders Fest celebrates its history, people, and arts. The event combines the Prosper Fire Department's "Barbecue Cookoff", a 5K race, an art show, a music festival, and a Sunday Family Fellowship.

Education

Most of the Town of Prosper is served by the Prosper Independent School District.
 Rock Hill High School (grades 9–12, in Frisco)
 Prosper High School (grades 9–12)
 Reynolds Middle School (grades 6–8)
 Rogers Middle School (grades 6–8)
 Rushing Middle School (grades 6–8)
 Hays Middle School (grades 6–8, in Frisco)
 Baker Elementary School (grades K–5, in McKinney)
 Boyer Elementary School (grades K–5, in Celina)
 Cockrell Elementary School (grades K–5)
 Folsom Elementary School (grades K–5)
 Furr Elementary School (grades K–5, in McKinney)
 Hughes Elementary School (grades K–5, in McKinney)
 Johnson Elementary School (grades K–5, in Celina)
 Light Farms Elementary School (grades K–5, in Celina)
 Rucker Elementary School (grades K–5)
 Spradley Elementary School (grades K–5, in Frisco)
 Stuber Elementary School (grades K–5)
 Windsong Ranch Elementary School (grades K–5)
 Reeves Elementary School (grades K–5, in McKinney)
 Bryant Elementary School (grades K–5)

In January 2018, Prosper ISD began construction of a natatorium and a football stadium. The facilities opened in the fall of 2019.

Prosper ISD will open their third high school, Walnut Grove High School, in the fall of 2023.

The Glenbrooke and Doe Creek subdivisions in far west Prosper are within the Denton Independent School District. Residents currently attend:
 Savannah Elementary School (grades K–5) 
 Navo Middle School (grades 6–8)
 Ray Braswell High School (grades 9–12)

The Texas Legislature designated Collin College as the community college for all of Collin County and for Prosper ISD. The majority of Denton County, including the part of Prosper in Denton ISD, is zoned to North Central Texas College.

Notable people

Chris Buescher, NASCAR Cup Series driver for RFK Racing who won the 2015 NASCAR Xfinity Series Championship
Matt Carpenter, Major League Baseball player, St. Louis Cardinals, New York Yankees
Todd Eldredge, three-time Olympian and six-time world champion figure skater
Pat Fallon, president of Virtus Apparel, based in Prosper, and Republican member of the Texas House of Representatives from District 106 in Denton County
Marc Fein, journalist and NBC news anchor
Justin Forsett, NFL player
LaTroy Hawkins, MLB player
Torii Hunter, MLB player, Minnesota Twins and Anaheim Angels
Ronald Kauffman, Pairs figure skater (with his sister, Cynthia) in 1964, 1968 Olympics; Four-time US Champions 1966–69; Two-time North American Champions 1967, 1969; US Figure Skating Hall of Fame Inductee (1995)
Dak Prescott, NFL player
Jaret Reddick, musician
Lorene Rogers, biochemist; first woman in the United States to lead a public university, the University of Texas
Deion Sanders, professional athlete
Ann Ward, winner of the 15th cycle of America's Next Top Model
Davis Webb, NFL player and former quarterback for Texas Tech University and the University of California

References

External links
 Town of Prosper official website

Towns in Collin County, Texas
Towns in Denton County, Texas
Towns in Texas
Dallas–Fort Worth metroplex